Matt Birkbeck (born Brooklyn, N.Y.) is an American investigative journalist and author.

He wrote the best selling books The Quiet Don (2013), about Mafia boss Russell Bufalino, A Beautiful Child (2004), which told the tragic story of "Sharon Marshall" and her "father" Franklin Delano Floyd, and the sequel Finding Sharon (2018), which is a memoir about his ten-year effort, along with the FBI and National Center for Missing & Exploited Children, to find Sharon's true identity. Both books were adapted for the 2022 hit Netflix documentary Girl in the Picture, for which he is the executive producer. 

He also authored Deconstructing Sammy: Music, Money, Madness, and the Mob (2008) about the life of Sammy Davis Jr. and efforts to resolve his debts and his legacy.

A Deadly Secret: The Bizarre and Chilling Story of Robert Durst (2002/2015), about New York real estate scion Robert Durst, who was accused of murdering his wife Kathie Durst and two others. A Deadly Secret is considered the most accurate portrayal of the Robert Durst saga  and was adapted into the 2017 Lifetime movie The Lost Wife of Robert Durst. The book was originally published in 2002.

Career
Birkbeck worked from 2004 to 2010 at The Morning Call where he covered federal courts and wrote investigative stories, focusing on corruption and organized crime.

His lengthy reporting on Pennsylvania's flawed gaming initiative exposed political corruption at the highest levels of state government, including then-Governor Ed Rendell and the state Supreme Court. In 2009 he was subpoenaed to testify before a special prosecutor appointed by the Pennsylvania Supreme Court to investigate alleged leaks in the prosecution of a businessman with alleged mob ties who was awarded a license to operate a casino. 
Birkbeck's reporting on the case served as the basis of his bestselling book The Quiet Don: The Untold Story of Mafia Kingpin Russell Bufalino, which was published in 2013 by Berkley/Penguin.

Earlier, at the Pocono Record, he wrote a multi-part investigative series A Price Too High published in April 2001 that exposed how home builders, appraisers, mortgage companies and major banks conspired to defraud thousands of homebuyers, mostly minorities from the New York area, and forced them into bankruptcy and foreclosure. For his reporting, which spurred numerous state, local and federal investigations, as well as Congressional hearings, Birkbeck received an Investigative Reporters and Editors award in 2002. The New York Times followed up his reporting with a lengthy feature in April 2004. Birkbeck and the Pocono Record were sued for libel by a home builder in 2003, and the case went to trial in Monroe County, Pa. in 2010 before a jury, which ruled in favor of Birkbeck and the newspaper.

He has written magazine pieces and features for Boston Magazine, Philadelphia Inquirer, The New York Times, Reader's Digest, Playboy and others.

He was also a correspondent for People magazine covering mostly crime and human interest stories including the 1999 death of John F. Kennedy Jr., the 9/11 attacks in New York, and the Robert Durst investigation. His work on the Robert Durst case led to the publication of A Deadly Secret in 2002.

In 2010 he joined business publisher Harrison Scott Publications, where he covers securitization and regulatory issues in Washington, D.C. HSP was sold to Green Street in 2020.

Books 

 A Deadly Secret: The Strange Disappearance of Kathie Durst Berkley/Penguin 2002
 A Beautiful Child Berkley/Penguin 2004
 Till Death Do Us Part: Love, Marriage and the Mind of the Killer Spouse (with psychotherapist Dr. Robi Ludwig) Atria/Simon & Schuster 2006
 Deconstructing Sammy: Music, Money, Madness, and the Mob Amistad/Harper Collins 2008
 The Quiet Don: The Untold Story of Mafia Kingpin Russell Bufalino Berkley/Penguin 2013
 A Deadly Secret: The Bizarre and Chilling Story of Robert Durst Berkley/PenguinRandomHouse 2015
 Finding Sharon Summerville 2018
 The Life We Chose: William "Big Billy" D'Elia and the Last Secrets of America's Most Powerful Mafia Family William Morrow/Harper Collins July 2023

Film adaptations

Girl in the Picture debuted on Netflix on July 6, 2022 and is based on A Beautiful Child and Finding Sharon. It was directed by Skye Borgman, with Birkbeck serving as executive producer. A day after its release, it was Netflix's number one movie in the world, and remained there for several weeks.  

A Deadly Secret was adapted as a TV movie by Lifetime in 2017 as The Lost Wife of Robert Durst. It starred Katharine McPhee as Kathie Durst and Daniel Gillies as Robert Durst.

Deconstructing Sammy was optioned for a feature film, documentary and scripted TV series by Byron Allen for his Entertainment Studios in 2015.

Awards
Birkbeck received an Investigative Reporters and Editors Award in 2002 for his groundbreaking stories on mortgage fraud in the U.S.

References

External links
 Matt Birkbeck official website, mattbirkbeck.com; accessed March 15, 2015.
 HarperCollins Author Biography

Living people
Place of birth missing (living people)
Year of birth missing (living people)
American male journalists
21st-century American non-fiction writers
Writers from Pennsylvania
21st-century American male writers